Frances Elizabeth Barrow  (Mease; pen name, Aunt Fanny; February 22, 1822May 7, 1894) was a 19th-century American children's writer.

Biography
Frances (nickname, "Frankie Blue") Elizabeth Mease was born in Charleston, South Carolina, February 22, 1822. Her parents were Charles Benton Mease, of Charleston, and Sarah Matilda Graham of Boston. Barrow's sister, Alexina Black Mease married Richard Grant White in 1850.

Barrow's nom de plume of "Aunt Fanny", first appeared in 1855, when she began to write books for children. There were twenty-five in all, and some were translated in Europe. They included Six Night Caps, Aunt Fanny's Story Book, Four Little Hearts, and Take Heed. Barrow also wrote The Wife's Stratagem, a novel, and The Letter G.

On December 7, 1841, she married James Barrow, Jr. He died at the age of 53 at Maison Labeyrie, rue Bernadotte, Pau, France, November 18, 1868 and was interred in Pau. She died at 30 East Thirty-fifth street, in New York City, May 7, 1894. The interment was in Woodlawn Cemetery. Two daughters, Mrs. S. L. Holly and Mrs. Theodore Connoly, survived her.

Selected works
 Stories told in the wood, 1864
 Little nightcaps., 1861
 Fairy nightcaps, 1861
 Big nightcap Letters
 The birdnests' stories

References

Attribution

Bibliography

External links

 

1822 births
1894 deaths
19th-century American women writers
19th-century American writers
19th-century pseudonymous writers
American children's writers
Writers from Charleston, South Carolina
Pseudonymous women writers
Burials at Woodlawn Cemetery (Bronx, New York)
Wikipedia articles incorporating text from A Woman of the Century